Nagorskoye is a rural locality (a village) in Mayskoye Rural Settlement, Vologodsky District, Vologda Oblast, Russia. The population was 5 as of 2002. There are 8 streets.

Geography 
Nagorskoye is located 13 km northwest of Vologda (the district's administrative centre) by road. Yermolovo is the nearest rural locality.

References 

Rural localities in Vologodsky District